The Beauties are a Canadian alternative country band from Toronto.

Career  
They formed at the Dakota Tavern in 2006.  The band members are Shawn Creamer, Derek Downham, Paul Pfisterer, Jud Ruhl and Darin McConnell.

The Beauties have opened for Skydiggers, Broken Social Scene, Justin Rutledge and Jason Collett, and have backed up songwriters including Ron Sexsmith, Jim Cuddy and Serena Ryder.

They signed to Six Shooter Records in 2009. That same year, Now Magazine named the Beauties as the best roots/country band in Toronto.

They recorded an EP with Serena Ryder, but so far only one song from those sessions has been released; a cover of "The Funeral" by Band of Horses.

On June 1, 2010, they released their first full length, self-titled album on Six Shooter Records.

Discography
 Die Die Die EP (Independent, 2008)
  The Beauties (Independent, 2010)

References

External links

 Six Shooter Records

Musical groups established in 2006
Musical groups from Toronto
Canadian alternative country groups
Six Shooter Records artists
2006 establishments in Ontario